is a Japanese politician of the Liberal Democratic Party and a member of the House of Representatives in the Diet (national legislature). He served as the Minister of Defense from 2012 to 2014 and again from 2017 to 2018.

Early life and education
A native of Kesennuma, Miyagi, Onodera was born on May 5, 1960. He received a bachelor's degree from Tokyo University of Fisheries in 1983. He entered Matsushita Institute of Government and Management in 1990. Then he studied politics at the University of Tokyo. He graduated from both and obtained his master's degree in political science in 1993.

Career
Onodera joined the government of Miyagi Prefecture in April 1983. He worked at Tohoku Fukushi University as special lecturer, assistant professor and guest professor from April 1994 to January 1998. He was elected to the House of Representatives for the first time in December 1997 from Miyagi Prefecture No. 6, but resigned in 2000 in the wake of an electoral donation scandal. In October 2002, he became an associate professor at Tohoku Fukushi University. However, he ran for the house in 2003 and was re-elected. He served as parliamentary secretary for foreign affairs for two times from 2004 to 2005. He served at and chaired different committees regarding foreign affairs, and was the head of the LDP's foreign affairs division. He was appointed senior vice-minister for foreign affairs in August 2007.

Shinzō Abe named Itsunori Onodera defense minister on December 26, 2012. Like Abe, the majority of his government, and many predecessors as defense ministers, Onodera is affiliated to the revisionist lobby group Nippon Kaigi. Onodera supports Japan having the ability to launch a first-strike attack against enemy bases.

Onodera has advocated for the installation of the Aegis Ashore missile defense system in Japan, travelling to proposed installation sites in Akita Prefecture and Yamaguchi Prefecture to win local consent.

Personal life
Onodera is married and has two children.

References

External links

|-

1960 births
21st-century Japanese politicians
Liberal Democratic Party (Japan) politicians
Living people
Japanese defense ministers
Members of Nippon Kaigi
Members of the House of Representatives (Japan)
People from Kesennuma, Miyagi
University of Tokyo alumni